The Gangster Disciples (often abbreviated as the GD's, formerly GDN) are an African American street and prison gang, which was formed in 1969, by Larry Hoover and David Barksdale. The two rival gangsters united together to form the Black Gangster Disciple Nation (BGDN). Since 1989, after a decline in leadership caused friction between the two gangs, the BGDN has divided into different factions known today as the Gangster Disciples and the other being the Black Disciples.

As of 2022, the Gangster Disciples have no full leadership following Hoover's departure.

History 
The origins of the Gangster Disciples began in Englewood on the South Side of Chicago, Illinois, in 1964 when 13-year-old Larry "The King" Hoover joined a small street gang called the Supreme Gangsters. For years, the Supreme Gangsters had an outstanding war with the Devil's Disciples, led by David Barksdale. In 1969, Hoover and Barksdale agreed to a ceasefire. This resulted in the creation of the Black Gangster Disciple Nation. By the early 1970s, the BGDN dominated the Chicago gang scene. In 1970, Barksdale was shot in his kidney and later pronounced dead in a hospital at the age of 27 in 1974. Following his death, Hoover assumed full control of the Black Gangster Disciples.

Folk Nation 

In 1978, the BGDN begin to splinter into three subsets; one of each being the Black Gangsters, Black Disciples and the Gangster Disciples, however Hoover (at the time incarcerated on murder charges) prevented it by quickly setting up an alliance of all street and prison gangs in his interest into one family.

The alliance consisted of Gangster, Black, Lady, Satan, Maniac Latin, Spanish Gangster Disciples, Ambrose, the Two-Two Boys, Two Sixers, Simon City Royals, North Side Insane Popes, La Raza Nation, Spanish Cobras, Imperial Gangsters, Harrison Gents, and the Latin Eagles.

Expansions 
The Gangster Disciples are active in over 100 cities and 31 states, predominantly in the Midwestern and Southeastern United States, and remnants also maintain a significant presence in the U.S. prison system. The gang had between approximately 50,000 and 90,000 members. The gang had expanded through the North and West Sides of Chicago, as well as Indianapolis, Minneapolis, Kansas City, Detroit, Milwaukee, Cincinnati, Birmingham and co-founder Hoover's birthplace of Jackson. They first emerged in significant numbers in Memphis, Tennessee in the 1980s, the first modern street gang to do so.

Splintering of the Black Disciples 
In 1989, Hoover's attention of the Black Gangster Disciples began to die down as he focused solely on the Gangster Disciples, enraging parts of the BGDN's subsets and the Folk Nation. Members of the Black Disciples decided to splinter from the Black Gangster Disciples, resulting in the reinvention of the original gang name and the incorporation of the new Gangster Disciples. Other members who felt disrespected by Hoover's declining orders decided to get his attention again by instigating gang-related shootings toward the new GD's. Two noted shootings that related to the dispute between the two Disciple gangs was a drug-related shooting that killed some members of the Gangster Disciples and the 1991 revenge murder of Black Disciple leader Mickey "Bull" Johnson.

Notable incidents of gang-related violence 

On Independence Day 2005, men claiming to be members of the Gangster Disciples street gang killed Sergeant Juwan Johnson of the U.S. Army in the small town of Hohenecken (known today as Kaiserslautern) near Ramstein, Germany. Prosecutors accused U.S. Air Force Senior Airman Rico Williams of being the first one to start attacking Johnson in a six-minute beating that he had to endure to join the gang. After the beating Johnson asked one of his fellow gang members to take him to the hospital. Williams then ordered his gang members not to take him there. Johnson later died from multiple blunt-force trauma injuries. According to the government's investigations, Williams was the leader of the gang set operating on base. Senior Airman Williams was sentenced to 22 years in prison, while other servicemen faced sentences ranging from 2 to 12 years. Some of the charges against the servicemen were: Williams, second-degree murder and witness tampering; Air Force Staff Sergeant Jerome Jones, conspiracy to commit assault, gang participation, and other charges; Airman Nicholas Sims and Army Sergeant Rodney Howell; involuntary manslaughter; Private Terrance Norman, voluntary manslaughter.

The Gangster Disciples were implicated in the 2008 murders of member Cecil Dotson Sr., his fiancée Marissa Williams, fellow member Hollis Seals, and his girlfriend Shindri Roberson. Also killed were Cecil and Marissa's 4-year-old son Cemario and Cecil's son with Erica Smith, 2-year-old Cecil Dotson II. The toddler had been spending the night with his father and siblings. Severely injured in the attack were Cecil and Marissa's other three children nine-year-old Cecil Dotson Jr., five-year-old Cedric and two-month-old Ce'niyah. Allegations were originally made that the Gangster Disciples were responsible for the event which came to be known as "The Lester Street Massacre" and was featured in two separate episodes of The First 48 on A&E. Cecil and his family were butchered by Dotson's own brother, Jessie, who eventually confessed to the killings. He was convicted on all counts and sentenced to six death sentences plus 120 years for the three children (his niece and nephews) that he attempted to kill. The Gangster Disciples were cleared of any involvement.

On July 21, 2020, a car pulled up to a funeral home in Chicago's Englewood area, and two gunmen infiltrated the property, opening fire. Fifteen people were wounded, with no reported fatalities. The funeral was for a victim killed a week prior, and was allegedly involving a dispute between two Gangster Disciples factions.

Arrests and incarcerations 
In 1989, a member of the Gangster Disciples was arrested on felony drug-related offenses. He was found guilty and sentenced to 28 years in prison.

On April 27, 2016, 32 members of Gangster Disciples were arrested on RICO charges by federal agents. Among the 32 arrested was a former Atlanta-area police officer who prosecutors say was a hit man for the gang. The indictment alleges that Gangster Disciples members committed 10 murders, 12 attempted murders, 2 robberies, the extortion of rap artists to force the artists to become affiliated with the Gangster Disciples, and fraud resulting in losses of over $450,000. In addition, the Gangster Disciples trafficked in large amounts of heroin, cocaine, methamphetamine, illegal prescription drugs, and marijuana. The indictment also seek forfeiture of 34 different firearms seized as part of the investigation.

On January 25, 2021, seven members of the gang throughout Naperville, Illinois, and Cape Girardeau, Missouri, were all arrested and charged with RICO-related federal charges. The charges alleged that on April 28, 2018, three members under a leader's order, allegedly killed Leroy Allen as part of a leadership dispute at a Gangster Disciples meeting in Bridgeton, Missouri. A month later, on May 18, two other members allegedly killed Ernest Wilson, a rival board member, in Chicago. Other acts of violence alleged as part of the conspiracy include a nightclub stabbing in East St. Louis, Illinois, a nonfatal shooting in Cape Girardeau and multiple unsuccessful murder plots. The seven-member indictment also claimed drug trafficking by two members, including a scheme to smuggle the synthetic drug “K2” into a Scott County, Missouri state prison.

Indictment, incarceration and departure of Larry Hoover 
On August 22, 1995, after a 17-year undercover joint investigation by the Illinois Department of Corrections, Federal Bureau of Investigation, Bureau of Alcohol, Tobacco, Firearms and Explosives, Hoover was arrested for conspiracy, extortion, money laundering, drug-related offenses, and continuing to engage in a criminal enterprise.  The investigation used wiretaps to determine that Hoover was still operating in illegal activities within the GDs. In 1997, he stood trial in the U.S. District Court for the Northern District of Illinois. Hoover was found guilty on all charges. He was sentenced to three additional life terms in federal prison. Hoover is currently serving his sentence at the ADX Florence in Fremont County, Colorado.

In July 2022, Hoover claimed to had renounced his gang ties, ending his affiliation with the Gangster Disciples.

Symbolism/colors 
The predominant symbol of this gang is the six-pointed Star of David. The Gangster Disciples use the upward crossed pitchforks ("forks"). The organization's colors are black and royal blue.

See also
OutLaw Gangster Disciples
Gangs in Chicago

References

External links
FBI file on the Gangster Disciples
Gang Threat Analysis: The Black Disciples
National Drug Intelligence Center document on the Vice Lords

Organizations established in 1968
1968 establishments in Illinois
Street gangs
African-American gangs
Gangs in Chicago
African-American history in Chicago
United States military scandals
Prison gangs in the United States